Jon W. Finson (born 4 November 1950) is an American musicologist.

Works 
He became known through the publication of the first version of Schumann's Symphony No. 4 in D minor in 2003 in Wiesbaden.
Two of his six books published to date can be regarded as masterpieces of Robert Schumann research:
 Robert Schumann and the Study of Orchestral Composition: The Genesis of the First Symphony; Op. 38 (Studies in Musical Genesis and Structure). Clarendon Press, Oxford 1989, 
 Robert Schumann: The Book of Songs. Harvard University Press, Cambridge MA 2007,

Prizes 
Together with Ulf Wallin, he won the 2013 Robert Schumann Prize of the City of Zwickau.

References

External links 
 5 October 2012 – Schumann-Preisträger 2013 stehen fest. schumannzwickau.de; Short biography

University of North Carolina at Chapel Hill faculty
1950 births
Living people
Writers from Chicago
20th-century American musicologists
21st-century American musicologists